Phil Weidman (born 1936 in Alturas, California) is an American poet who has written nine books of poetry. His first collection, Sixes, was published in 1968. A graduate of Chico High School, Weidman served a two-year hitch in the U.S. Army before working as a newspaper reporter. He got his B.A. and master's degree from California State University, Sacramento in 1968 and 1970, respectively.

In addition to his poetry, he was worked a school teacher in the Sacramento area. His poetry has been published in a wide variety of small, prestigious literary magazines, including the Chiron Review, |Hearse, Olé, and the Wormwood Review.

References

Sources
Rattlesnake Press: Phil Weidman Bio

1936 births
American male poets
Writers from Sacramento, California
California State University, Sacramento alumni
Living people
People from Alturas, California